Men Shouldn't Sing is a musical comedy New Zealand film written by Jeff Clark and composed by Michael Bell. It tells the story of a group of strangers, snatched from their homes, who wake to find that they spontaneously break into song and dance whenever they feel a heightened emotion. The group, trapped in a musical that is becoming more dangerous by the minute, must work together to find a way out.

Men Shouldn't Sing had its premiere on 2 December 2007 at the Isaac Theatre Royal in Christchurch, New Zealand.

Cast 
Jennine Bailey as Gina
Lynn Booth as Carol
Scott Koorey as Dr. Lloyd-Menkin
Lucy MacVicar as Felicity
Gary Miller as Brian
James Nation-Ingle as Doug
West Relugas as Hans
Sam Taylor as Pete
Michal Williams as Steph

Soundtrack and songs
All Songs Recorded by the Orange Studio Orchestra
Overture
Something's Wrong
Can't Stop Singing
Who's in Charge
Hans' Lament
Dr Phil
Zombie Boogie
Love Street
Can't Say It Right Without A Song
Men Shouldn't Sing
Slightly Inappropriate Feelings
Men Shouldn't Sing Reprise
Zombie Ballet
Endgame
Don't Call Me Mad

External links
 
 

New Zealand musical comedy films
2000s musical comedy films
2007 films
2007 comedy films
2000s English-language films